Sahasahakama is a river village in the central part of the island of Guadalcanal, Solomon Islands. Gold Ridge a mining location, is just to the east.

References

Populated places in Guadalcanal Province